Ainslie Football Club is a semi-professional Australian rules football club based in Canberra, in the Australian Capital Territory.

The club formed in 1927 and won its first premiership in 1929.

Ex-St Kilda star Kevin Neale was captain-coach for six seasons (1978–1983), during which time Ainslie won four premierships: 1979, 1980, 1982, 1983. 

In 1984 Ex-Collingwood and Richmond player Rod Oborne captain-coached the club, winning the 1984 premiership. The club was also coached by former VFL/AFL great David Cloke.  Chris Rourke coached Ainslie for 14 years from 2007-2020 taking the club to six premierships during that period.

The club entered the NEAFL for the competition's inaugural season in 2011 - finishing the year as Eastern Conference premiers. The club left NEAFL at the end of the 2015 season and returned to the AFL Canberra competition.

The Club's male record games holder is Todd Pulford (236 games) and the female record holder is Dani Curcio (236 games*).

Club Patrons 
The Ainslie Football Club has had 10 Club Patrons.

Club Presidents 
There have been 21 Presidents of the Ainslie Football Club.

Ainslie Women's First Grade Coaches 
Ainslie Football Club has had 11 Women's First Grade Coaches.

Ainslie Men's First Grade Coaches 
Ainslie Football Club Men's First Grade Coaches and Premiership years.

AFL/VFL players
There are list of past and present Ainsile players who have played at AFL/VFL:

 Alan Bloomfield (North Melbourne)
 Neil Bristow (Footscray)
 Nathan Buckley (Brisbane Bears and Collingwood)
 David Cloke (Richmond and Collingwood)
 Brian Cook (Melbourne)
 Aldo Dipetta (St. Kilda and Sydney Swans)
 Ray Donnellan (Fitzroy)
 Bob Furler (1918–1998) (Hawthorn)
 Nick Heyne (St. Kilda)
 James Hird (Essendon)
 John Jillard (1941–1998) (Footscray)
 Ken McGregor (Adelaide)
 Kevin Neale (St. Kilda)
 Nick Salter (Port Adelaide)
 Marcus Seecamp (Fitzroy and Melbourne)
 Robert Shirley (Adelaide)
 Rob Smith (1951–2013) (North Melbourne)
 Ross W. Smith (North Melbourne)
 Shaun Smith (North Melbourne and Melbourne)
 Alan Stevens (1923–2010) (St. Kilda)
 Jason Tutt (Western Bulldogs and Carlton)
 Aaron vandenBerg (Melbourne)

AFLW players
There are list of past and present Ainsile players who have played at AFLW:

 Ashleigh Brazil (Collingwood)
 Britt Tully (Greater Western Sydney)
 Tess Cattle (Greater Western Sydney - drafted June 2022)
 Georgia Clayden (Gold Coast Suns - selected June 2022)

External links

 
 Full Points Footy profile for Ainslie

 
1927 establishments in Australia
Australian rules football clubs established in 1927